The 1937 Syracuse Orangemen football team represented Syracuse University in the 1937 college football season. The Orangemen were led by first-year head coach Ossie Solem and played their home games at Archbold Stadium in Syracuse, New York. On October 18, Syracuse made its first ever appearance in the AP Poll, which was in its second year of operation. The team was ranked 17th in the first poll of the season, but dropped from the poll after a loss to Maryland.

Schedule

Maryland game and Wilmeth Sidat-Singh
Syracuse and nearby Cornell were among the first collegiate football teams to include African-American players as starting backfield players. Wilmeth Sidat-Singh, starred for Syracuse, playing a position equivalent to modern-day quarterback.

In that era, when games were played in Southern segregation states, African-American players from Northern schools were banned from the field. Because of his light complexion and name, Sidat-Singh was sometimes assumed to be a "Hindu" (as people from India were often called by Americans during this time). However. shortly before a game against the University of Maryland, a black sportswriter, Sam Lacy, wrote an article in the Baltimore Afro-American, revealing Sidat-Singh's was African-American. Maryland refused to let him play and he was held out of the game and Syracuse lost the game 0-13. In a rematch the following year at Syracuse, Sidat-Singh led the Orange to a lopsided victory (53-0) over Maryland.

On Saturday, Nov. 9, 2013, the University of Maryland publicly apologized to surviving relatives at a ceremony during a football game at Syracuse.

References

Syracuse
Syracuse Orange football seasons
Syracuse Orangemen football